One third of Runnymede Borough Council in Surrey, England is elected each year, followed by one year where there is an election to Surrey County Council instead. The council is divided up into 14 wards, electing 41 councillors, since the last boundary changes in 2019.

Political control
Since the first election to the council in 1973 political control of the council has been held by the following parties:

Leadership
The leaders of the council since 2016 have been:

Council elections
1973 Runnymede District Council election
1976 Runnymede District Council election (New ward boundaries)
1979 Runnymede Borough Council election (Borough boundary changes took place but the number of seats remained the same)
1980 Runnymede Borough Council election
1982 Runnymede Borough Council election
1983 Runnymede Borough Council election
1984 Runnymede Borough Council election
1986 Runnymede Borough Council election
1987 Runnymede Borough Council election
1988 Runnymede Borough Council election
1990 Runnymede Borough Council election
1991 Runnymede Borough Council election (Borough boundary changes took place but the number of seats remained the same)
1992 Runnymede Borough Council election
1994 Runnymede Borough Council election
1995 Runnymede Borough Council election
1996 Runnymede Borough Council election
1998 Runnymede Borough Council election (Borough boundary changes took place but the number of seats remained the same)
1999 Runnymede Borough Council election
2000 Runnymede Borough Council election (New ward boundaries)
2002 Runnymede Borough Council election
2003 Runnymede Borough Council election
2004 Runnymede Borough Council election
2006 Runnymede Borough Council election
2007 Runnymede Borough Council election
2008 Runnymede Borough Council election
2010 Runnymede Borough Council election
2011 Runnymede Borough Council election
2012 Runnymede Borough Council election
2014 Runnymede Borough Council election
2015 Runnymede Borough Council election
2016 Runnymede Borough Council election
2018 Runnymede Borough Council election
2019 Runnymede Borough Council election
2021 Runnymede Borough Council election
2022 Runnymede Borough Council election

By-elections

1994-1998

1998-2002

2002-2006

2006-2010

2010-2014

2014-2018

References

 By-election results

External links
Runnymede Borough Council

 
Borough of Runnymede
Council elections in Surrey
Runnymede